In mathematics, genus (plural genera) has a few different, but closely related, meanings. Intuitively, the genus is the number of "holes" of a surface. A sphere has genus 0, while a torus has genus 1.

Topology

Orientable surfaces

The genus of a connected, orientable surface is an integer representing the maximum number of cuttings along non-intersecting closed simple curves without rendering the resultant manifold disconnected. It is equal to the number of handles on it. Alternatively, it can be defined in terms of the Euler characteristic χ, via the relationship χ = 2 − 2g for closed surfaces, where g is the genus. For surfaces with b boundary components, the equation reads χ = 2 − 2g − b. In layman's terms, it's the number of "holes" an object has ("holes" interpreted in the sense of doughnut holes; a hollow sphere would be considered as having zero holes in this sense). A torus has 1 such hole, while a sphere has 0. The green surface pictured above has 2 holes of the relevant sort.

For instance:
 The sphere S2 and a disc both have genus zero.
 A torus has genus one, as does the surface of a coffee mug with a handle. This is the source of the joke "topologists are people who can't tell their donut from their coffee mug."

Explicit construction of surfaces of the genus g is given in the article on the fundamental polygon.

In simpler terms, the value of an orientable surface's genus is equal to the number of "holes" it has.

Non-orientable surfaces
The non-orientable genus, demigenus, or Euler genus of a connected, non-orientable closed surface is a positive integer representing the number of cross-caps attached to a sphere. Alternatively, it can be defined for a closed surface in terms of the Euler characteristic χ, via the relationship χ = 2 − k, where k is the non-orientable genus.

For instance:
 A real projective plane has a non-orientable genus 1.
 A Klein bottle has non-orientable genus 2.

Knot
The genus of a knot K is defined as the minimal genus of all Seifert surfaces for K. A Seifert surface of a knot is however a manifold with boundary, the boundary being the knot, i.e.
homeomorphic to the unit circle. The genus of such a surface is defined to be the genus of the two-manifold, which is obtained by gluing the unit disk along the boundary.

Handlebody
The genus of a 3-dimensional handlebody is an integer representing the maximum number of cuttings along embedded disks without rendering the resultant manifold disconnected. It is equal to the number of handles on it.

For instance:
 A ball has genus 0.
 A solid torus D2 × S1 has genus 1.

Graph theory

The genus of a graph is the minimal integer n such that the graph can be drawn without crossing itself on a sphere with n handles (i.e. an oriented surface of the genus n). Thus, a planar graph has genus 0, because it can be drawn on a sphere without self-crossing.

The non-orientable genus of a graph is the minimal integer n such that the graph can be drawn without crossing itself on a sphere with n cross-caps (i.e. a non-orientable surface of (non-orientable) genus n).  (This number is also called the demigenus.)

The Euler genus is the minimal integer n such that the graph can be drawn without crossing itself on a sphere with n cross-caps or on a sphere with n/2 handles.

In topological graph theory there are several definitions of the genus of a group. Arthur T. White introduced the following concept. The genus of a group G is the minimum genus of a (connected, undirected) Cayley graph for G.

The graph genus problem is NP-complete.

Algebraic geometry
There are two related definitions of genus of any projective algebraic scheme X: the arithmetic genus and the geometric genus.  When X is an algebraic curve with field of definition the complex numbers, and if X has no singular points, then these definitions agree and coincide with the topological definition applied to the Riemann surface of X (its manifold of complex points). For example, the definition of elliptic curve from algebraic geometry is connected non-singular projective curve of genus 1 with a given rational point on it.

By the Riemann–Roch theorem, an irreducible plane curve of degree  given by the vanishing locus of a section  has geometric genus

where s is the number of singularities when properly counted.

Differential geometry

In differential geometry, a genus of an oriented manifold  may be defined as a complex number  subject to the conditions
 
 

In other words,  is a ring homomorphism , where  is Thom's oriented cobordism ring.

The Euler characteristic  is not a genus in this sense since it is not invariant concerning cobordisms.

Biology 
Genus can be also calculated for the graph spanned by the net of chemical interactions in nucleic acids or proteins. In particular, one may study the growth of the genus along the chain. Such a function (called the genus trace) shows the topological complexity and domain structure of biomolecules.

See also
 Group (mathematics)
 Arithmetic genus
 Geometric genus
 Genus of a multiplicative sequence
 Genus of a quadratic form
 Spinor genus

Citations

References

Topology
Geometric topology
Surfaces
Algebraic topology
Algebraic curves
Graph invariants
Topological graph theory
Geometry processing